The San Diego Toreros baseball team is the varsity intercollegiate baseball program of the University of San Diego, located in San Diego, California, United States. The program has been a member of the NCAA Division I West Coast Conference since prior to the 1985 season. Since 2013, its home venue has been Fowler Park, located on the University of San Diego campus. Rich Hill was the program's head coach from 1999 until 2021. As of the end of the 2012 season, the team has appeared in seven NCAA Tournaments, all since 2002.  It has won four conference championship series, three regular season conference championships, and two regular season division championships. As of the start of the 2014 Major League Baseball season, 15 former Toreros have appeared in Major League Baseball.

History
The team began play in the 1958 season as an independent school in the NCAA College Division, made up of the athletic programs of small universities and colleges.  The school, founded in the early 1950s, was then known as the San Diego College for Men, and its athletic programs were known as the Pioneers.  Mike Morrow was the program's head coach for its first six seasons (1958–1963), and the team had an 82–64 record during his tenure.  In 1961, the school's athletic programs were renamed the Toreros, for the Roman Catholic school's connections to Spain.

John Cunningham era

In 1964, John Cunningham became the program's second head coach.  In 1966, the team joined its first conference, the College Division's Southern California Athletic Conference (SCAC).  In four seasons in the conference (1966–1969), the team had a conference record of 25–26–1.  Prior to the 1970 season, the Toreros left the SCAC to become a College Division Independent again.  Also in 1970, the team began playing in a new venue, which would eventually be dedicated to John Cunningham.

In 1972, the San Diego College for Men merged with the San Diego College for Women to form the University of San Diego.

Through the 1973 season, NCAA institutions had competed in two divisions– the large-school University Division and the small-school College Division.  After the 1973 season, however, the NCAA reorganized into its modern, three-division format.  The University Division became the modern Division I, while the College Division became Division II and Division III.  San Diego, which had previously competed as a College Division Independent, became a Division II Independent.

After five seasons as a Division II Independent, the Toreros transitioned to Division I prior to the 1979 season, joining the Southern California Baseball Association (SCBA).  The SCBA, which began play in the 1977 season, was the southern division of a baseball-only merger of the Pacific Coast Athletic Association (PCAC) and the West Coast Athletic Conference (WCAC).  The SCBA's counterpart, the Northern California Baseball Association (NCBA), also began play in the 1977 season.  San Diego played six seasons in the SCBA, never finishing higher than fourth in the conference.

The SCBA and NCBA stopped operating after the 1984 season, and the PCAC and WCAC returned to sponsoring separate baseball conferences.  As a result, San Diego joined the WCAC following the 1985 season.  Shortly thereafter (following the 1988 season), the conference was renamed the West Coast Conference (WCC).  San Diego struggled in its first several seasons in the league, finishing no higher than fourth from 1985–1991.  In 1992 and 1993, however, the Toreros had consecutive second-place finishes and consistently finished highly in the 1990s.

Following the 1998 season, John Cunningham retired after 35 seasons.  The team's venue had been renamed John Cunningham Stadium in 1988, and Cunningham retired as San Diego's all-time wins leader with 843 wins.  Then-San Francisco head coach Rich Hill was hired to replace Cunningham.

Rich Hill era
In 1999, Rich Hill's first season, the WCC split into two, four-team divisions, the West Division and the Coast Division.  The Toreros finished third, second, and second in 1999, 2000, and 2001, respectively.  The team then won the West Division and the West Coast Conference Championship Series in both 2002 and 2003, appearing in its first two NCAA Tournaments.  San Diego again qualified for the tournament in 2006.

In 2007, the Toreros had a 43–18 overall record and an 18–3 WCC record.  After winning the WCC Championship Series, the team received a berth in the 2007 NCAA Division I baseball tournament as the #8 National Seed.  The team hosted a Regional at crosstown rival San Diego State's home ballpark, Tony Gwynn Stadium, but was eliminated after consecutive losses to Fresno State and Minnesota.

Individually, in both 2007 and 2008, pitcher Brian Matusz was named a First-Team All-American.  Matusz is the only San Diego player to be named to the First Team.

The team returned to the NCAA tournament in 2008, 2010, and 2012, but failed to advance out of the Regional round.

On June 18, 2021, Hill resigned from his head coaching position to become the head baseball coach at Hawaii.

2012 MLB draft
In the 2012 Major League Baseball draft, the following four Toreros were selected: P Paul Sewald by the New York Mets (10th round), P James Pazos by the New York Yankees (13th round), OF Bryan Haar by the Minnesota Twins (34th round), and P Calvin Drummond by the Oakland Athletics (38th round).  Sewald, Pazos, and Haar signed professional contracts.

Brock Ungricht era
Brock Ungricht joined San Diego as a hitting coach and recruiting coordinator in 2019. Upon long-time head coach Rich Hill's departure at the end of the 2021 season, Ungricht was elevated to the head coach position.

Conference affiliations
 Independent (College Division) (1958–1965)
 Southern California Athletic Conference (College Division) (1966–1969)
 Independent (College Division/Division II) (1970–1978)
 Southern California Baseball Association (Division I) (1979–1984)
 West Coast Conference (1985–present)
 Known as the West Coast Athletic Conference from 1985–1988

Venues

John Cunningham Stadium

John Cunningham Stadium, located on the university's campus, was the program's home venue from prior to the 1970 season until after the 2012 season.  Before the field's 1970 construction, the program had played at several different venues in San Diego.  The field had a capacity of 1,200 spectators and was named for former San Diego head coach, John Cunningham, who coached the team from 1964–1998.

Fowler Park

Beginning in the 2013 season, the team will play at Fowler Park, built on the location of Cunningham Stadium, which was demolished in summer 2012.  Fowler has a capacity of 1,700 spectators that can be expanded to 3,000.  The park is named for Ron and Alexis Fowler, who donated much of the stadium's $13 million construction cost.  The playing field itself is named Cunningham Field, dedicated to the same coach for whom the program's former venue was named.

Head coaches
The team's most successful head coach is former coach John Cunningham, who won 843 games from 1964–1998.  Also, Cunningham's 35 seasons as head coach make him the longest tenured coach in program history.

Current coaching staff
 Head coach – Brock Ungricht
 Assistant coach / Recruiting Coordinator – Matt Florer
 Assistant coach – Erich Pfohl
 Assistant coach – Ryan Kirby

Yearly record
The following is a list of the Toreros' yearly records since the program began play in 1958.

Toreros in the Major Leagues

Taken from the 2020 San Diego Toreros Record Book.

See also
 List of NCAA Division I baseball programs

References

External links